William Humphrys Archdall (6 June 1813 - 23 June 1899), also known as Archdale, was an Irish Conservative politician who sat in the House of Commons from 1874 to 1885.

Archdall was the son of Edward Archdall of Riversdale and Castle Archdale and his wife Matilda Humphrys, daughter of William Humphrys of Ballyhaise Cavan. He was educated at Tamworth and Exeter College, Oxford and in 1835 was admitted to Lincoln's Inn. He was a J.P. and Deputy Lieutenant for Fermanagh and was High Sheriff of Fermanagh in 1845. He was also J.P. for County Tyrone and was High Sheriff of Tyrone in 1861. In 1864 he inherited the Riversdale estate on the death of his father.

At the 1874 general election Archdall succeeded his brother Mervyn Edward Archdale as Member of Parliament for Fermanagh. He held the seat until 1885.

On 22 December 1895, Archdall succeeded his brother as head of the Archdale family and in 1896 he changed his name by Royal Licence to William Humphrys Mervyn Archdale in accordance with the will of his uncle General Mervyn Archdall.

Archdall married Emily Mary Maude, daughter of Rev. John Charles Maude in 1845. He married secondly, in 1894, Matilda Mary Alley, daughter of William Alley.

Arms

References

External links
 

1813 births
1899 deaths
UK MPs 1880–1885
UK MPs 1874–1880
Alumni of Exeter College, Oxford
Members of Lincoln's Inn
Deputy Lieutenants of Fermanagh
High Sheriffs of County Fermanagh
High Sheriffs of Tyrone
Members of the Parliament of the United Kingdom for County Fermanagh constituencies (1801–1922)